Anthony Cosmo may refer to:
Anthony Cosmo (musician), formerly of the band Boston
Anthony Cosmo (lacrosse) (born 1977), Canadian lacrosse player
Tony Cosmo, actor and musician